The United States of Indonesia (abbreviated as RIS), was a short-lived federal state to which the Netherlands formally transferred sovereignty of the Dutch East Indies (except Netherlands New Guinea) on 27 December 1949 following the Dutch–Indonesian Round Table Conference. This transfer ended the four-year conflict between Indonesian nationalists and the Netherlands for control of Indonesia.  It lasted less than a year, before being replaced by the unitary Republic of Indonesia.

Background

In January 1942, the Japanese invaded the Dutch East Indies, displacing the Dutch colonial government. On 17 August 1945, two days after the Japanese surrender, Indonesian nationalist leader Sukarno declared Indonesian independence.  The Dutch, viewing Sukarno and the Indonesian leadership as having collaborated with the Japanese, decided to restore their authority. However, British South East Asia Command, under Lord Louis Mountbatten, who had responsibility for the Dutch East Indies, refused to allow Dutch troops to land in Java and Sumatra and recognised de facto Republican authority there. However, the Dutch were able to reassert control over most of the area previously occupied by the Japanese Navy, including Borneo and the Great East. Discussions between the British and the Dutch resulted in Acting Governor-General of the Dutch East Indies Hubertus van Mook  proposing eventual self-determination for an Indonesian commonwealth. In July 1946, the Dutch  organised the Malino Conference in Sulawesi at which representatives from Borneo and eastern Indonesia backed the proposal for the federal United States of Indonesia with links to the Netherlands. It would comprise four elements, Java, Sumatra, Dutch Borneo and the Great East. This was followed on 15 November by the Linggadjati Agreement, in which the Dutch recognised de facto republican control over Sumatra, Java and Madura, and the Republic of Indonesia agreed to the principle of a federal Indonesia in which it would be one state. The Dutch then organised the December 1946 Denpasar Conference, which led to the establishment of the State of East Indonesia, followed by a state in West Borneo in 1947.

Military action by the Dutch launched on 20 July 1947 against areas controlled by the Indonesian republicans, Operation Product, resulted in the Dutch regaining control of West and East Java, the areas around Medan, Palembang and Padang in Sumatra. The United Nations called for a ceasefire, and negotiations between the two sides led to the Renville Agreement of January 1948, with a ceasefire along the "Van Mook Line", which connected the most advanced Dutch positions. The Dutch then established states in the areas they had reoccupied, including East Sumatra (December 1947), Madura and  West Java (February 1948), South Sumatra (September 1948) and East Java (November 1948). The leaders of these regions then established the Federal Consultative Assembly.

A second Dutch military action, Operation Kraai, aimed at destroying the Republic, was launched on 18 December 1948. Despite recapturing the major cities of Java, including the republican capital of Yogyakarta, and all of Sumatra except Aceh in the far north, it triggered the protest resignation of the cabinets of the State of East Indonesia and Pasundan (West Java) and the Sultan of Yogyakarta from his position as regional head. There was also pressure from the United States and the United Nations, in particular in the form of a Security Council resolution. The Dutch agreed to negotiations with Indonesia to arrange a transfer of sovereignty. The Dutch–Indonesian Round Table Conference took place in The Hague from August to November 1949 and resulted in the Dutch agreeing to hand over sovereignty to the Dutch East Indies, except for Western New Guinea. However, many Indonesian nationalists believed that the Dutch had insisted on a federal state in an attempt to weaken or even break up the new nation, a manifestation of a "divide and conquer" strategy. Nevertheless, on 27 December 1949, sovereignty was transferred to the United States of Indonesia.

Governance

The RIS had a bicameral legislature. The People's Representative Council consisted of 50 representatives from the Republic of Indonesia and 100 from the various states according to their populations. The Senate had two members from each constituent part of the RIS regardless of population, making 32 members in total. The state was governed according to the Federal Constitution of 1949, which had been drawn up on the sidelines of the Round Table Conference. It had a cabinet of 16 members, led by Prime Minister Hatta.

Constituent entities

The RIS comprised sixteen main entities: seven states  (negara), including the "Republic of Indonesia" consisting of parts of Java and Sumatra (a combined population of over 31 million); and the nine formerly directly-ruled territories (neo-lands). Apart from the Republic of Indonesia, all these constituent entities, which had populations between 100,000 and 11 million, were established by the Dutch.  Also included were some smaller entities not seen as viable as distinct political entities.

Dissolution
From the outset, the majority of Indonesians were opposed to the federal system resulting from the Round Table Agreement. The main reason was the fact that the whole concept was associated with colonialism. However there were other reasons, including the feeling that a federal state lacked cohesion and would potentially lead to states seceding and that the Indonesian side had only accepted it as a short-term tactic. In addition, most of the non-republican areas were controlled by traditional rulers, who were seen as too pro-Dutch and anachronistic.  Finally, there were insufficient ethnic or cultural ties between people in the individual states to overcome the dominance of Java. For example, although the population of the State of Madura was entirely ethnic Madurese, almost as many Madurese lived in the ethnically mixed State of East Java, forming a substantial minority.

Even those who supported the idea of a federal state wanted the form of it to be decided by the people of Indonesia through an elected Constitutional Assembly, rather by than the former colonial power. The Dutch also tried to convince Indonesians that a unitary state would mean Javanese domination, although without much success.

In March and April 1950, all the constituents of the RIS except East Sumatra and East Indonesia  dissolved themselves into the Republic. From 3–5 May, a three-way conference between the State of East Indonesia, the State of East Sumatra and the Republic of Indonesia ended with a decision to merge the three entities into a single unitary state. On 19 May, an announcement was issued by the governments of the United States of Indonesia (representing the two remaining constituent states) and the Republic of Indonesia, which stated that all parties, "...have reached an agreement to jointly create a unitary state as the transformation of the Republic of Indonesia proclaimed on 17 August 1945". The United States of Indonesia was officially dissolved by President Sukarno on 17 August 1950the fifth anniversary of his proclamation of independenceand replaced by the unitary Republic of Indonesia.

See also
History of Indonesia
Indonesian National Revolution
Indonesian regions
List of members of the Senate of the United States of Indonesia
Netherlands-Indonesian Union
State of East Indonesia

Notes

References

 

 

 
 
 
 
 
 
 
 

 
1950 disestablishments in Indonesia
States and territories established in 1949
States and territories disestablished in 1950
Indonesia, United States of
1949 establishments in Indonesia